OSO 3 (Orbiting Solar Observatory 3), or Third Orbiting Solar Observatory (known as OSO E2 before launch) was launched on March 8, 1967, into a nearly circular orbit of mean altitude 550 km, inclined at 33° to the equatorial plane.  Its on-board tape recorder failed on June 28, 1968, allowing only the acquisition of sparse real-time data during station passes thereafter; the last data were received on November 10, 1969.  OSO 3 reentered the Earth's atmosphere and burned up on April 4, 1982.

Like all the American Orbiting Solar Observatory (OSO) series satellites, it had two major segments: one, the "Sail", was stabilized to face the Sun, and carried both solar panels and Sun-pointing experiments for solar physics.  The other, "Wheel" section, rotated to provide overall gyroscopic stability and also carried sky scanning instruments that swept the sky as the wheel turned, approximately every 2 seconds.

Instrumentation

The Sail carried a hard X-ray experiment from UCSD, with a single thin NaI(Tl) scintillation crystal plus phototube enclosed in a howitzer-shaped CsI(Tl) anti-coincidence shield. The energy resolution was 45% at 30 keV. The instrument operated from 7.7 to 210 keV with 6 channels.  The Principal Investigator (PI) was Prof. Laurence E. Peterson of UCSD.  Also in the wheel was a cosmic gamma-ray (>50 MeV) sky survey instrument contributed by MIT, with PI  Prof. William L. Kraushaar.

Scientific results
OSO-3 obtained extensive hard X-ray observations of solar flares, the cosmic diffuse X-ray background, and multiple observations of Scorpius X-1, the first observation of an extrasolar X-ray source by an observatory satellite.

The MIT gamma-ray instrument obtained the first identification of high-energy cosmic gamma rays emanating from both galactic and extra-galactic sources.

See also

 Orbiting Solar Observatory
 X-ray astronomy

References

External links
The content of this article was adapted and expanded from NASA's HEASARC: Observatories OSO 3  and NASA's National Space Science Data Center: OSO 3  (Public Domain)

Spacecraft launched in 1967
Satellites formerly orbiting Earth